Manipal Hospitals may refer to:
Manipal Hospitals India, a chain of multi-specialty hospitals in India.
Bukit Tinggi Medical Centre (formerly known as Manipal Hospitals Klang located in Malaysia)